New York's 115th State Assembly district is one of the 150 districts in the New York State Assembly. It has been represented by Billy Jones since 2017.

Geography
District 115 is the northernmost district in the state. It encompasses the entirety of Clinton County, Franklin County and the towns of St. Armand, Wilmington, North Elba and Keene in Essex County.

2010s 
District 115 encompassed the entirety of Clinton County, Franklin County and the towns of Brasher, Hopkinton, Lawrence and Piercefield in St. Lawrence County.

Recent election results

2022

2020

2018

2016

2014

2012

References

115
Clinton County, New York
Franklin County, New York
St. Lawrence County, New York